Kuzehgaran or Kuzeh Garan may refer to:
 Kuzeh Garan, Gilan
 Kuzehgaran, Kermanshah
 Kuzehgaran, West Azerbaijan